The Stadium Municipal d'Albi is a multi-purpose stadium in Albi, France.  It is currently used for rugby league as the home ground of Racing Club Albi XIII and rugby union as the home of SC Albi. After an expansion project completed in 2007, the stadium holds 13,000 with 8,000 seated.

History 

Built and opened in 1964 the ground immediately became the home of the towns two rugby clubs Racing Club Albi XIII and Sporting Club Albi. The ground is also used for athletic meetings. The ground originally had a main cantilever stand which held 1,800 seated spectators and a smaller unseated stand for 1,200, at either end there were semi-circular standing terraces. Initially called Le Stadium, in 1977 the ground hosted the French rugby league championship Final despite the fact that Racing Club Albi XIII were in the final against AS Carcassonne the 'home' side won 19–10 in front of 18,325 fans, which was and still is the record attendance.  It hosted its first international rugby league match in 1979 when the France national rugby league team beat the Papua New Guinea rugby league team 16–9. In 1987 the end terracing's were flattened to make way for an Olympic standard eight lane athletic track. At the 2000 Rugby League World Cup the ground played host to two group 3 matches France beat South Africa 56–6 in front of a crowd of 7,696 and Papua New Guinea beat Tonga 30–22 in front of a crowd of 3,666. The ground was renovated in 2006 and expanded in 2007 giving it its current capacity of 13,058.

Rugby League Internationals

French Rugby League Championship (Elite 1) Finals

Lord Derby Cup Finals

References

Rugby league stadiums in France
Rugby union stadiums in France
Rugby League World Cup stadiums
Multi-purpose stadiums in France
Athletics (track and field) venues in France
Sports venues in Tarn (department)
Sports venues completed in 1962